Dan Tana (born 1935 as Dobrivoje Tanasijević) is a Serbian and American restaurateur, actor, football administrator/executive, and former professional footballer. 

Tana is best known as the proprietor of an eponymous restaurant, Dan Tana's, in West Hollywood, California, as well as being closely associated with football clubs Red Star Belgrade and Brentford F.C.

Early life
Born in 1935 in the Kingdom of Yugoslavia capital Belgrade to Serbian parents—kafana owner father Radojko Tanasijević and housewife mother Lenka Milošević—the mother gave birth while the father was away serving his mandatory Royal Yugoslav Army stint and she went to be with her parents in her home village of Čibutkovica near Lazarevac.

Growing up on Kraljice Natalije Street near the Zeleni Venac open market in Belgrade, young Dobrivoje, nicknamed Bata, was a lively kid with a keen interest in football. With the outbreak of World War II in Yugoslavia following the April 1941 German invasion, Dobrivoje's father moved to the countryside, staying with his parents (Dobrivoje's grandparents) in order to avoid conscription. As a result, young Dobrivoje who stayed in Belgrade with his mother did not see his father for four years until the end of the war.

With the post-war transformation of Yugoslavia from a monarchy into a Stalinist people's republic under the Communist Party (KPJ) rule of Josip Broz Tito, Dobrivoje's father Radojko, despite not participating in the war as part of any armed faction, was adjudged by the new communist authorities to be class enemy and sentenced to 12 years in a labour camp while his pre-war kafana, Složna braća, was nationalized. The father ended up serving a year before being released and finding employment in the now state-owned kafana that he had owned before the war.

Football career

Youth football at Red Star Belgrade
Tanasijević was spotted playing football at 12, and offered an apprenticeship with Red Star Belgrade. He spent five years at Red Star, developing as a striker.

Defection from Yugoslavia, playing with Anderlecht
Tanasijević's restaurateur father had been arrested by the new communist authorities established at the end of the Second World War by Marshal Tito, and his restaurants nationalised.

Tanasijević was aged 17 when he toured Belgium in 1952 as part of the junior squad of the Yugoslav football team Red Star Belgrade to play R.S.C. Anderlecht. While in Brussels, Tana abandoned the team and stayed in Belgium.

While in Belgium, Tana saw the senior Red Star Belgrade team play Anderlecht, and was spotted in the crowd by the Red Star captain Rajko Mitić. Mitić told Anderlecht of Tanasijević's ability, and arranged a trial for Tanasijević with them. Anderlecht offered Tanasijević a four-year contract, but as a defector he could not play club football in Belgium for two years. Anderlecht loaned Tana to Hannover.

Canada
After spending six months on loan with Hannover, in the summer of 1955, he was offered a contract to play for Montreal Hakoah FC of the National Soccer League in Canada. Playing in Montreal, he won successive Canadian league titles and the Dominion Cup.

United States
After playing poker with a friend, Tanasijević won $5,000, after betting $100; everything they had. With his friend, Luca, Tanasijević decided to go to Hollywood though they had no valid passports. Luca was later taken away by men in a black limousine who Tana assumed were immigration officers. Tana faced the dilemma of whether to return to Canada to resume his football career or remain in the United States, with $10 to his name. He decided to remain in Hollywood and began working as a dishwasher.

Working as a dishwasher Tanasijević was recognized by a Serb who had seen him play in Canada. With no money, legal papers or a place to stay, the man offered Tanasijević a place to stay and Tanasijević eventually found his way to the Californian league football team Yugoslavian American. The team arranged a job for Tana in a local tuna cannery, and the football contract allowed him to stay in the United States legally.

Simultaneously, young Tanasijević began drama lessons with Jeff Corey in Malibu to improve his accent when speaking English as he tried to break into acting. The group of hopefuls attending Corey's classes with Tanasijević included young Natalie Wood, Kim Novak, and Angie Dickinson. Corey, a banned actor turned acting teacher after being blacklisted in Hollywood during the Second Red Scare (McCarthyism) witchhunt in the United States, thought Tanasijević's looks and accent might enable him to play 'bad guy roles' in films. Tanasijević, now going by Americanized Dan Tana, soon made his cinematic debut in a small part of a Nazi torpedo engineer in 1957's The Enemy Below, starring Curt Jürgens and Robert Mitchum. For the role Tana earned US$20,000 for eight weeks work, more than he ever had playing football. Tana also appeared in the films The Untouchables, Rin Tin Tin and Peter Gunn. He rejected an approach from Hannover to return to Europe to play football in 1960, as he was involved in the running of a nightclub, Peppermint West. Tana later became the general manager of the football team L.A. Toros and helped found the first professional soccer league in the United States.

Hospitality career
Ever since first arriving in California in 1956, while attempting to transition professionally from playing football (soccer) to acting, Tana took various odd jobs—such as working in a tuna cannery and as dishwasher at the Villa Capri restaurant—as his main source of income. Gradually, unable to support himself from his sporadic acting gigs, and unwilling to go back to Europe to continue pursuing his journeyman football playing career, Tana began working in hospitality. Living in a small apartment above Villa Capri, he continued working at the restaurant as a bus boy for its owner Pasquale "Patsy" D'Amore.

Tana then became involved in the running of a nightclub, Peppermint West, that catered to young patrons looking to partake in the twist craze.

In the early 1960s, Tana worked as the maître d' at a Beverly Hills restaurant, La Scala, owned by a Santander-born Spanish (of Basque ethnicity) immigrant to the U.S., Jean Leon, who had launched the spot in 1956 on North Canon Drive having had previously also worked for D'Amore at Villa Capri. While working for Leon at La Scala, Tana was part of the restaurant's staff that also included Matty "Matteo" Jordan, Joe Patti, and Piero Selvaggio each of whom would later go on to launch successful and long-running Italian restaurants of their own around the Los Angeles area. Jordan launched Matteo's in November 1963 on Westwood Boulevard in the L.A. neighbourhood of West Los Angeles that continued running even after his 1999 death under a different ownership. Selvaggio launched Valentino on Pico Boulevard in Santa Monica in December 1972 that ran for 46 years before closing in late 2018. Patti launched La Famiglia in late 1974 on North Canon Drive in Beverly Hills before closing almost two decades later in August 1994.

Dan Tana's

In 1964, twenty-nine-year-old Tana launched his own eatery by taking over the Dominick's hamburger restaurant on Santa Monica Boulevard in West Hollywood from an art-gallerist friend Chuck Feingarten for US$30,000 (US$287,000 in 2023) with a three-year payment schedule of US$10,000 annually. For decades prior, the location had also housed food hospitality venues: first, Black's Lucky Spot Café counter-style lunch joint catering to the workers doing maintenance on the Pacific Electric's old Red Car Trolley that ran outside along Santa Monica Blvd. until the 1950s, followed by Domenico's Lucky Spot. Tana renamed his newly-acquired venue after himself, Dan Tana's, changing its concept to New York City-style Italian dinner spot with a small bar and hiring chef Michele Diguglio to run the kitchen.

1960s
Housed in a 1929 bungalow a few doors down from the Troubadour nightclub, the newly-launched 20-table restaurant's best received features initially were its steak and unpretentious atmosphere. Described as "resolutely untrendy" while offering classic Italian pasta dishes such as fettuccine, lasagna, and eggplant parmesan, the new dinner restaurant on Santa Monica Boulevard would start becoming a favourite Hollywood hangout two years into its operation, after struggling for a steady clientele at first. Attempting to supplement the insufficient revenue the new restaurant was generating, Tana looked for investors among the celebrity friends and acquaintances he had already made through his previous jobs in hospitality around L.A., even offering a 50% ownership stake in Dan Tana's for US$15,000 to the baseball legend Joe DiMaggio who came in to eat one night with a friend, movie producer Sidney Beckerman. Both turned Tana down. Simultaneously, the owner continuously tried to generate some celebrity buzz for the restaurant by inviting friends/acquaintances such as Robert Mitchum, Cary Grant, Glenn Ford, etc. to drop by, but very few actually showed up.

Tana credits a 1966 enthusiastic review in the high-circulation Los Angeles Times—calling Dan Tana's the "discovery of the year" and the "best new Italian restaurant in the city"—for its first big spike in business at a time when it barely made a profit. Prior to the effusive 1966 LA Times review, the restaurant had reportedly been doing about 25 dinners per night, however, after the review, the number increased to 200 dinners per night. Benefiting from its proximity to the Academy of Motion Picture Arts and Sciences (AMPAS) headquarters at the Marquis Theater just around the corner on Melrose Avenue, Dan Tana's emerged as a spot for the film industry personalities and professionals to commingle. As a result of the increased demand, Tana had to hire a lot more staff as the restaurant only had two waiters and one bartender. 

By 1967, Dan Tana's was already established among the entertainment industry insiders—and hopefuls looking to break in—as the "right place" in town to be seen and make social connections that could be leveraged into business ones. Resisting the then-popular practice of restaurant staff bringing telephones to the tables as per customer requests, Tana insisted—even after vociferous protestation from an infuriated Universal Pictures studio executive Ned Tanen—on a relaxed ambiance allowing customers to eat in relative anonymity. 

In 1968, Tana hired fellow Yugoslav, Miljenko "Michael" Gotovac, initially as a waiter before moving to bartender; Gotovac—a Croat born in 1943 in the village of Lećevica before leaving Communist Yugoslavia in 1964 as a young gastarbeiter to West Germany and eventually arriving in the U.S. in 1967—would go on to become one of Dan Tana's staples for the following 52 years, displaying a gruff, big-hearted personality while tending the bar and pouring drinks in what some saw as curmudgeonly fashion.

Chef Diguglio left after five years, in 1969, at which point Tana hired another fellow Yugoslav, Mate Mustać, who had been working on Italian cruise ships, as the new chef.

1970s
Into the 1970s, already frequented by a great number of film industry individuals—from major showbusiness eminences such as John Wayne, Kirk Douglas, Karl Malden, and studio boss Lew Wasserman to emerging New Hollywood personalities such as Harry Dean Stanton, Jack Nicholson, screenwriter Carole Eastman, and director Bob Rafelson—the eatery was embraced by the hugely popular television personality Johnny Carson after he moved his highly-rated nightly program The Tonight Show to the West Coast in 1972. While conducting an interview on the show with Richard Burton—another Dan Tana's regular who had been playfully complaining about being turned away from the eatery—Carson even proclaimed Dan Tana's to be his favourite restaurant in Los Angeles. 

As a result of the nearby Troubadour club beginning to book big stars like Elton John and Van Morrison, Dan Tana's did away with its customary 11 p.m. closing time, keeping its kitchen open late until 12:30 or 1 a.m. in order to cater to the concert-goers looking for a late-night dining spot after the shows ended. As the restaurant gained in popularity, owner Tana refused to undertake large expansion or open additional locations, stating in a 1997 interview that "if you really want to be successful with a restaurant, you can have only one—it's like a wife".

Due to its location next to the Troubadour nightclub, Dan Tana's also saw many musicians come in to eat and drink over the decades, including members of The Byrds, The Mamas & the Papas, and the Eagles as well as Frank Zappa, Elton John, and Bette Midler. The Eagles' guitarist Glenn Frey and drummer Don Henley were said to have been inspired into writing their 1975 hit "Lyin' Eyes" after once eating at Dan Tana's while observing the many beautiful women in the restaurant, many of whom were with much older wealthy men.

1980s
In the early morning hours of 1 August 1980, a fire burned down almost the entire restaurant. Tana received an outpouring of support from regulars encouraging him to rebuild Dan Tana's just the way it was. Some of them, such as singer Linda Ronstadt starring at the time in a Broadway staging of The Pirates of Penzance, went even further; upon hearing of Tana facing a multiple-month delay just to get building permits approved by the city, she asked her boyfriend, California governor Jerry Brown to help. As a result of Ronstadt and governor Brown intervening, the restaurant was able to re-open in six weeks. 

In the early 1980s, Tana hired Mike Miljković to be the restaurant's general manager and Jimmy Cano as its maître d'.

In 1988, yet another Yugoslav, Neno Mladenović (a Split-born Croat), joined as a cook working under chef Mustać; eventually, during early 2000s, Mladenović would replace Mustać as chef. The same year, Tana hired a young aspiring actor, Craig Susser, as a waiter; Susser would end up staying at Dan Tana's for the following 23 years: first as waiter and weekend bartender before being promoted in 2002 to maitre d' and manager.

By the late 1980s, already running for 25 years, Dan Tana's continued attracting glamorous Hollywood patrons. In a 1989 Los Angeles Times review, the restaurant was described as hosting "plenty of flesh and hair, lots of dames and a movie crowd that looks as if it was costumed for a film noir" with "plenty of two-cheek kissy-kissy stuff going on from table to table, the way they do in Rome or Cannes".

Since accumulating a number of regulars over decades, Dan Tana's began naming dishes after them thus offering veal Jerry Weintraub, scaloppine Karl Malden, braciola Vlade Divac, chopped salad Nicky Hilton, steak Dabney Coleman, and shrimp scampi Jerry Buss.

In popular culture
Owing to Tana's friendship with television producers Aaron Spelling and E. Duke Vincent, both regulars at Dan Tana's, the two decided to name Robert Urich's character Dan Tanna, the main role in their 1978 U.S. television drama Vega$, after the restaurateur. The series ran for three seasons with Tana reportedly receiving US$500 per airing (first-run episodes, re-runs, and syndication) in royalties, altogether making US$500,000 that he donated to charity.

Hamish Linklater's character Joey Dantana in The Newsroom is also named for Tana. Tana has produced eight films.

The restaurant is referenced in the songs "Small Clone" by Mayer Hawthorne, "But I Am A Good Girl" from the Burlesque soundtrack, and "Christmas in LA" by The Killers and Dawes.

Association football executive career

Los Angeles Toros general manager
In 1967, more than a decade removed from his time as a professional footballer, an increasingly successful West Hollywood restaurateur Tana was hired to be the general manager of the newly-established Los Angeles Toros franchise of the simultaneously newly-launched National Professional Soccer League (NPSL), one of the first attempts at establishing a professional soccer league in the United States. Not sanctioned by FIFA but with a two-year CBS U.S. national television contract, the NPSL looked to cater to what at the time—following unexpectedly good television ratings of the 1966 FIFA World Cup final in the U.S. on NBC—seemed like large untapped soccer market in the country. 

Due to being one of the rare NPSL executives maintaining active connections to individuals within European club football, Tana's involvement with the NPSL project went beyond just the franchise employing him, the Toros, as the new North American soccer league went about staffing nine other new franchises with players, coaches, and executives. Calling on his Yugoslavia football connections, Tana put the new Oakland Clippers NPSL franchise in touch with his former Red Star Belgrade boss, dr. Aca Obradović, who would soon reach an agreement to become the Clippers general manager and in turn bring a head coach and number of Yugoslav footballers from Red Star, FK Partizan, and OFK Beograd to Oakland: head coach Ivan Toplak as well as players such as Ilija Mitić, Mirko Stojanović, Momčilo Gavrić, Dimitrije Davidović, Milan Čop, Ilija Lukić, Sele Milošević, and Dragan Đukić. 

As for Tana's Toros soccer team—owned by Dan Reeves who had already been the owner of the NFL's Los Angeles Rams since 1941—it failed to gain a foothold into the L.A. sports scene, drawing only an average of 3,595 spectators to the their home matches at the 93,000 capacity Los Angeles Memorial Coliseum. 

Similarly, the NPSL itself—facing competition from a different professional U.S. soccer league launched in parallel, the United Soccer Association whose inaugural season ran from late May until mid July 1967—folded after just one season via the two competing leagues merging to form the North American Soccer League (NASL). The Los Angeles Toros relocated to San Diego, becoming the San Diego Toros, ahead of their first season in the NASL.

Brentford F.C. chairman
In 1973, Tana moved to London, feeling that "... I felt I had more to give to the game and to do that I had to be in a soccer culture. Football was calling me home." Meeting with the English playwright Willis Hall, Hall invited him to join a regular football gathering, which included broadcaster Michael Parkinson and the football personality Jimmy Hill. The manager of Brentford F.C., Frank Bluntstone, attended the gatherings and invited Tana to watch Brentford play. Tana was subsequently asked to join the board of Brentford, a privilege for which Tana bought five shares at 50p each.

Brentford were at the bottom of the Fourth Division at the time of Tana's involvement and had large debts and poor attendance. Tana later said that he had had "...big ambitions for Brentford...At that time English football was in trouble...the hooligans and poor facilities made it a very poor form of entertainment for anyone but young men...I wanted to feel comfortable taking my wife and children to a game. In America 30 percent of the fans in stadia were female. Here it was about one percent. If America needed English football, England needed American facilities."

Tana became chairman of Brentford and they were promoted and turned a profit. He resigned from the Brentford board in 2002. Tana was also part of the Football Association's International Committee.

Return to Yugoslavia
In 1988 Tana was approached to join the Yugoslav Football Federation by his former teammate, Miljan Miljanić, then president of the federation. With Yugoslavia Tana attended the 1990 FIFA World Cup, and felt his loyalties divided between both England and Yugoslavia. Tana subsequently prepared a Yugoslav side for the 1992 UEFA European Championship, from which they were banned as a result of United Nations sanctions. Tana was elected to the board of Red Star Belgrade in 2000.

Personal
Tana has a summerhouse vacation villa on the Dalmatian island of Hvar in the Adriatic Sea in what is now Croatia. Designed by him and built during the time of SFR Yugoslavia, the vacation property housed many of his Hollywood friends, including basketball player Wilt Chamberlain.

References

External links
 
 Dan Tana's official site

1935 births
Living people
Brentford F.C. directors and chairmen
Hannover 96 players
American restaurateurs
Red Star Belgrade footballers
Footballers from Belgrade
Yugoslav emigrants to Canada
Yugoslav expatriates in the United States
Yugoslav footballers
Yugoslav dissidents
Serbian anti-communists
Association footballers not categorized by position